Robert Walton may refer to:
 Robert E. Walton, American polo player and coach
 Bob Walton (1912-1992), Canadian professional ice hockey forward for the Montreal Canadiens and Pittsburgh Hornets.
 Rob Walton (ice hockey), Canadian professional ice hockey forward in the World Hockey Association
 Rob Walton or S. Robson Walton (born 1944), American billionaire and former chairman of Walmart
 Bob Walton (police commissioner), New Zealand police officer
 Robert Walton, character in the 1818 novel Frankenstein
 Robert Walton Goelet, American businessman
 Robert Walton Moore, American lawyer and politician